The 1994–95 season was the 49th season in Rijeka's history. It was their 4th season in the Prva HNL and 21st successive top tier season.

Competitions

Prva HNL

Classification

Results summary

Results by round

Matches

Prva HNL

Source: HRnogomet.com

Croatian Cup

Source: HRnogomet.com

Squad statistics
Competitive matches only.  Appearances in brackets indicate numbers of times the player came on as a substitute.

See also
1994–95 Prva HNL
1994–95 Croatian Cup

References

External links
 1994–95 Prva HNL at HRnogomet.com
 1994–95 Croatian Cup at HRnogomet.com 
 Prvenstvo 1994.-95. at nk-rijeka.hr

HNK Rijeka seasons
Rijeka